Oum Dreyga is a rural community located in the province of Oued Ed-Dahab in the Dakhla-Oued Ed-Dahab region in Western Sahara, with a population of 3,146, according to the 2014 general population and housing census.

It is also the name of a meteorite - Oum Dreyga (Amgala) H3-5 Chondrite Meteorite.

References

Populated places in Oued Ed-Dahab Province
Rural communes of Dakhla-Oued Ed-Dahab